Walter F. Tichy (born April 22, 1952, in Bad Reichenhall) is a German computer scientist. He was professor of computer science at the Karlsruhe Institute of Technology in Germany where he taught classes in software engineering until April 2022 when he retired.

To the larger software development community he is best known as the initial developer of the RCS revision control system. However, he has also written highly cited works on experimental software engineering, the string-to-string correction problem, software configuration management, and extreme programming.

References

External links 
 IPD Tichy - Prof. Dr. Walter F. Tichy - Website at the university department
 Articles by Walter F. Tichy

German computer scientists
Living people
1952 births